Tandur Assembly Constituency is a constituency of Telangana Legislative Assembly, India. It is one of 14 constituencies in Vikarabad District. It is part of Chevella Lok Sabha Constituency.

Patnam Mahender Reddy, was the former MLA and former Transport Minister of Telangana who was representing the constituency from 2014 - 2018.

P. Rohith Reddy was elected as the MLA on a Congress ticket in the Assembly elections held in Dec. 2018 and P.Rohith Reddy is currently representing the Tandur constituency. On 06-06-2019 he defected to Telangana Rashtra Samithi Party.

P.Rohith Reddy got 70428 votes and won against the veteran Patnam Mahender Reddy who got 67553 votes.
(Source : eciresults.nic.in)

After election P.Rohith Reddy joined Telangana Rashtra Samithi party.

Mandals
The Assembly Constituency presently comprises the following Mandals

Members of Legislative Assembly

Election results

Telangana Legislative Assembly election, 2018

See also
 Tandur
 List of constituencies of Telangana Legislative Assembly

References

Assembly constituencies of Telangana
Ranga Reddy district